Roy Lee Dorsey (April 25, 1889 – August 26, 1972) was an American Negro league pitcher in the 1910s.

A native of Kansas City, Missouri, Dorsey played for the Kansas City Giants in 1911. He died in Kansas City, Missouri in 1972 at age 83.

References

External links
Baseball statistics and player information from Baseball-Reference Black Baseball Stats and Seamheads

1889 births
1972 deaths
Kansas City Giants players